The Phoenician alphabet is an alphabet (more specifically, an abjad) known in modern times from the Canaanite and Aramaic inscriptions found across the Mediterranean region. The name comes from the Phoenician civilization.

The Phoenician alphabet is also called the Early Linear script (in a Semitic context, not connected to Minoan writing systems), because it is an early development of the Proto- or Old Canaanite or Proto-Sinaitic script, into a linear, purely alphabetic script, also marking the transfer from a multi-directional writing system, where a variety of writing directions occurred, to a regulated horizontal, right-to-left script. Its immediate predecessor, the Proto-Canaanite, Old Canaanite or Proto-Sinaitic script, used in the final stages of the Late Bronze Age, first in either Egypt or Canaan and then in the Syro-Hittite kingdoms, is the oldest fully matured alphabet, and it was derived from Egyptian hieroglyphs.

The Phoenician alphabet was used to write the Early Iron Age Canaanite languages, subcategorized by historians as Phoenician, Hebrew, Moabite, Ammonite and Edomite, as well as Old Aramaic. Its use in Phoenicia (coastal Levant) led to its wide dissemination outside of the Canaanite sphere, spread by Phoenician merchants across the Mediterranean world, where it was adopted and modified by many other cultures. It became one of the most widely used writing systems. The Phoenician alphabet proper remained in use in Ancient Carthage until the 2nd century BC (known as the Punic alphabet), while elsewhere it diversified into numerous national alphabets, including the Aramaic and Samaritan, several Anatolian scripts, and the early Greek alphabets. In the Near East, the Aramaic alphabet became especially successful, giving rise to the Jewish square script and Perso-Arabic scripts, among others.

"Phoenician proper" consists of 22 consonant letters (leaving vowel sounds implicit) – in other words, it is an abjad – although certain late varieties use matres lectionis for some vowels. As the letters were originally incised with a stylus, they are mostly angular and straight, although cursive versions steadily gained popularity, culminating in the Neo-Punic alphabet of Roman-era North Africa. Phoenician was usually written right to left, though some texts alternate directions (boustrophedon).

History

Origin 

The earliest known alphabetic (or "proto-alphabetic") inscriptions are the so-called Proto-Sinaitic (or Proto-Canaanite) script sporadically attested in the Sinai and in Canaan in the late Middle and Late Bronze Age. The script was not widely used until the rise of Syro-Hittite states in the 13th and 12th centuries BC.

The Phoenician alphabet is a direct continuation of the "Proto-Canaanite" script of the Bronze Age collapse period. The inscriptions found on the Phoenician arrowheads at al-Khader near Bethlehem and dated to c.1100 BCE offered the epigraphists the "missing link" between the two. The so-called Ahiram epitaph, whose dating is controversial, engraved on the sarcophagus of king Ahiram in Byblos, Lebanon, one of five known Byblian royal inscriptions, shows essentially the fully developed Phoenician script, although the name "Phoenician" is by convention given to inscriptions beginning in the mid-11th century BC. 
The German philologist Max Müller (1823-1900) believed that the Phoenician alphabet was derived from the Ancient South Arabian script during the 9th-century BC rule of the Minaeans over parts of the Eastern Mediterranean.

Spread and adaptations 

Beginning in the 9th century BC, adaptations of the Phoenician alphabet thrived, including Greek, Old Italic and Anatolian scripts.  The alphabet's attractive innovation was its phonetic nature, in which one sound was represented by one symbol, which meant only a few dozen symbols to learn. The other scripts of the time, cuneiform and Egyptian hieroglyphs, employed many complex characters and required long professional training to achieve proficiency; which had restricted literacy to a small elite.

Another reason for its success was the maritime trading culture of Phoenician merchants, which spread the alphabet into parts of North Africa and Southern Europe. Phoenician inscriptions have been found in archaeological sites at a number of former Phoenician cities and colonies around the Mediterranean, such as Byblos (in present-day Lebanon) and Carthage in North Africa. Later finds indicate earlier use in Egypt.

The alphabet had long-term effects on the social structures of the civilizations that came in contact with it. Its simplicity not only allowed its easy adaptation to multiple languages, but it also allowed the common people to learn how to write. This upset the long-standing status of literacy as an exclusive achievement of royal and religious elites, scribes who used their monopoly on information to control the common population. The appearance of Phoenician disintegrated many of these class divisions, although many Middle Eastern kingdoms, such as Assyria, Babylonia and Adiabene, would continue to use cuneiform for legal and liturgical matters well into the Common Era.

According to Herodotus, the Phoenician prince Cadmus was accredited with the introduction of the Phoenician alphabet—phoinikeia grammata, "Phoenician letters"—to the Greeks, who adapted it to form their Greek alphabet. Herodotus claims that the Greeks did not know of the Phoenician alphabet before Cadmus.
He estimates that Cadmus lived sixteen hundred years before his time (while the historical adoption of the alphabet by the Greeks was barely 350 years before Herodotus).

The Phoenician alphabet was known to the Jewish sages of the Second Temple era, who called it the "Old Hebrew" (Paleo-Hebrew) script.

Notable inscriptions

The conventional date of 1050 BC for the emergence of the Phoenician script was chosen because there is a gap in the epigraphic record; there are not actually any Phoenician inscriptions securely dated to the 11th century. The oldest inscriptions are dated to the 10th century.

 KAI 1: Ahiram sarcophagus, Byblos, c. 850 BC.
 KAI 14: Eshmunazar II sarcophagus, 5th century BC.
 KAI 15-16: Bodashtart inscriptions, 4th century BC.
 KAI 24: Kilamuwa Stela, 9th century BC.
 KAI 46: Nora Stone, c. 800 BC.
 KAI 47: Cippi of Melqart inscription, 2nd century BC.
 KAI 26: Karatepe bilingual, 8th century BC
 KAI 277: Pyrgi Tablets, Phoenician-Etruscan bilingual, c. 500 BC.
 Çineköy inscription, Phoenician-Luwian bilingual, 8th century BC.
(Note: KAI = Kanaanäische und Aramäische Inschriften)

Modern rediscovery
The Phoenician alphabet was deciphered in 1758 by Jean-Jacques Barthélemy, but its relation to the Phoenicians remained unknown until the 19th century. It was at first believed that the script was a direct variation of Egyptian hieroglyphs, which were deciphered by Champollion in the early 19th century.

However, scholars could not find any link between the two writing systems, nor to hieratic or cuneiform. The theories of independent creation ranged from the idea of a single individual conceiving it, to the Hyksos people forming it from corrupt Egyptian.  It was eventually discovered that the Proto-Sinaitic alphabet was inspired by the model of hieroglyphs.

Table of letters 
The chart shows the graphical evolution of Phoenician letter forms into other alphabets. The sound values also changed significantly, both at the initial creation of new alphabets and from gradual pronunciation changes which did not immediately lead to spelling changes. The Phoenician letter forms shown are idealized: actual Phoenician writing is less uniform, with significant variations by era and region. 

When alphabetic writing began, with the early Greek alphabet, the letter forms were similar but not identical to Phoenician, and vowels were added to the consonant-only Phoenician letters. There were also distinct variants of the writing system in different parts of Greece, primarily in how those Phoenician characters that did not have an exact match to Greek sounds were used. The Ionic variant evolved into the standard Greek alphabet, and the Cumae variant into the Italic alphabets (including the Latin alphabet).

The Runic alphabet is derived from Italic, the Cyrillic alphabet from medieval Greek. The Hebrew, Syriac and Arabic scripts are derived from Aramaic (the latter as a medieval cursive variant of Nabataean). Ge'ez is from South Arabian.

Letter names
Phoenician used a system of acrophony to name letters: a word was chosen with each initial consonant sound, and became the name of the letter for that sound. These names were not arbitrary: each Phoenician letter was based on an Egyptian hieroglyph representing an Egyptian word; this word was translated into Phoenician (or a closely related Semitic language), then the initial sound of the translated word became the letter's Phoenician value. For example, the second letter of the Phoenician alphabet was based on the Egyptian hieroglyph for "house" (a sketch of a house); the Semitic word for "house" was bet; hence the Phoenician letter was called bet and had the sound value b.

According to a 1904 theory by Theodor Nöldeke, some of the letter names were changed in Phoenician from the Proto-Canaanite script. This includes:
gaml "throwing stick" to gimel "camel"
digg "fish" to dalet "door"
hll "jubilation" to he "window"
ziqq "manacle" to zayin "weapon"
naḥš "snake" to nun "fish"
piʾt "corner" to pe "mouth"
šimš "sun" to šin "tooth"

Yigael Yadin (1963) went to great lengths to prove that there was actual battle equipment similar to some of the original letter forms named for weapons (samek, zayin).

Later, the Greeks kept (approximately) the Phoenician names, albeit they didn't mean anything to them other than the letters themselves; on the other hand, the Latins (and presumably the Etruscans from whom they borrowed a variant of the Western Greek alphabet) and the Orthodox Slavs (at least when naming the Cyrillic letters, which came to them from the Greek by way of the Glagolitic) based their names purely on the letters' sounds.

Numerals
The Phoenician numeral system consisted of separate symbols for 1, 10, 20, and 100. The sign for 1 was a simple vertical stroke (𐤖). Other numerals up to 9 were formed by adding the appropriate number of such strokes, arranged in groups of three. The symbol for 10 was a horizontal line or tack. The sign for 20 (𐤘) could come in different glyph variants, one of them being a combination of two 10-tacks, approximately Z-shaped. Larger multiples of ten were formed by grouping the appropriate number of 20s and 10s. There existed several glyph variants for 100 (𐤙). The 100 symbol could be multiplied by a preceding numeral, e.g. the combination of "4" and "100" yielded 400. The system did not contain a numeral zero.

Derived alphabets

Phoenician is well prolific in terms of writing systems derived from it, as many of the writing systems in use today can ultimately trace their descent to it, and consequently Egyptian hieroglyphs. The Latin, Cyrillic, Armenian and Georgian scripts are derived from the Greek alphabet, which evolved from Phoenician; the Aramaic alphabet, also descended from Phoenician, evolved into the Arabic and Hebrew scripts. It has also been theorised that the Brahmi and subsequent Brahmic scripts of the Indian cultural sphere also descended from Aramaic, effectively uniting most of the world's writing systems under one family, although the theory is disputed.

Early Semitic scripts
The Paleo-Hebrew alphabet is a regional variant of the Phoenician alphabet, so called when used to write early Hebrew. The Samaritan alphabet is a development of Paleo-Hebrew, emerging in the 6th century BC. The South Arabian script may be derived from a stage of the Proto-Sinaitic script predating the mature development of the Phoenician alphabet proper. The Geʽez script developed from South Arabian.

Samaritan alphabet 

The Phoenician alphabet continued to be used by the Samaritans and developed into the Samaritan alphabet, that is an immediate continuation of the Phoenician script without intermediate non-Israelite evolutionary stages. The Samaritans have continued to use the script for writing both Hebrew and Aramaic texts until the present day. A comparison of the earliest Samaritan inscriptions and the medieval and modern Samaritan manuscripts clearly indicates that the Samaritan script is a static script which was used mainly as a book hand.

Aramaic-derived

The Aramaic alphabet, used to write Aramaic, is an early descendant of Phoenician. Aramaic, being the lingua franca of the Middle East, was widely adopted. It later split off (due to political divisions) into a number of related alphabets, including Hebrew, Syriac, and Nabataean, the latter of which, in its cursive form, became an ancestor of the Arabic alphabet. The Hebrew alphabet emerges in the Second Temple period, from around 300 BC, out of the Aramaic alphabet used in the Persian empire. There was, however, a revival of the Phoenician mode of writing later in the Second Temple period, with some instances from the Qumran Caves, such as the "Paleo-Hebrew Leviticus scroll" dated to the 2nd or 1st century BC.

By the 5th century BCE, among Jews the Phoenician alphabet had been mostly replaced by the Aramaic alphabet as officially used in the Persian empire (which, like all alphabetical writing systems, was itself ultimately a descendant of the Proto-Canaanite script, though through intermediary non-Israelite stages of evolution). The "Jewish square-script" variant now known simply as the Hebrew alphabet evolved directly out of the Aramaic script by about the 3rd century BCE (although some letter shapes did not become standard until the 1st century CE).

The Kharosthi script is an Arabic-derived alphasyllabary used in the Indo-Greek Kingdom in the 3rd century BC. The Syriac alphabet is the derived form of Aramaic used in the early Christian period. The Sogdian alphabet is derived from Syriac. It is in turn an ancestor of the Old Uyghur. The Manichaean alphabet is a further derivation from Sogdian.

The Arabic script is a medieval cursive variant of Nabataean, itself an offshoot of Aramaic.

Brahmic scripts

It has been proposed, notably by Georg Bühler (1898), that the Brahmi script of India (and by extension the derived Indic alphabets) was ultimately derived from the Aramaic script, which would make Phoenician the ancestor of virtually every alphabetic writing system in use today, with the notable exception of written Korean (whose influence from the Brahmi-derived 'Phags-pa script has been theorized but acknowledged to be limited at best, and cannot be said to have derived from 'Phags-pa as 'Phags-pa derived from Tibetan and Tibetan from Brahmi).

It is certain that the Aramaic-derived Kharosthi script was present in northern India by the 4th century BC, so that the Aramaic model of alphabetic writing would have been known in the region, but the link from Kharosthi to the slightly younger Brahmi is tenuous. Bühler's suggestion is still entertained in mainstream scholarship, but it has never been proven conclusively, and no definitive scholarly consensus exists.

Greek-derived

The Greek alphabet is derived from the Phoenician. With a different phonology, the Greeks adapted the Phoenician script to represent their own sounds, including the vowels absent in Phoenician. It was possibly more important in Greek to write out vowel sounds: Phoenician being a Semitic language, words were based on consonantal roots that permitted extensive removal of vowels without loss of meaning, a feature absent in the Indo-European Greek. However, Akkadian cuneiform, which wrote a related Semitic language, did indicate vowels, which suggests the Phoenicians simply accepted the model of the Egyptians, who never wrote vowels. In any case, the Greeks repurposed the Phoenician letters of consonant sounds not present in Greek; each such letter had its name shorn of its leading consonant, and the letter took the value of the now-leading vowel.

The Alphabets of Asia Minor are generally assumed to be offshoots of archaic versions of the Greek alphabet.

The Latin alphabet was derived from Old Italic (originally derived from a form of the Greek alphabet), used for Etruscan and other languages. The origin of the Runic alphabet is disputed: the main theories are that it evolved either from the Latin alphabet itself, some early Old Italic alphabet via the Alpine scripts, or the Greek alphabet. Despite this debate, the Runic alphabet is clearly derived from one or more scripts that ultimately trace their roots back to the Phoenician alphabet.

The Coptic alphabet is mostly based on the mature Greek alphabet of the Hellenistic period, with a few additional letters for sounds not in Greek at the time. Those additional letters are based on the Demotic script.

The Cyrillic script was derived from the late (medieval) Greek alphabet. Some Cyrillic letters (generally for sounds not in medieval Greek) are based on Glagolitic forms.

Paleohispanic scripts 

These were an indigenous set of genetically related semisyllabaries, which suited the phonological characteristics of the Tartessian, Iberian and Celtiberian languages. They were deciphered in 1922 by Manuel Gómez-Moreno but their content is almost impossible to understand because they are not related to any living languages. While Gómez-Moreno first pointed to a joined Phoenician-Greek origin, following authors consider that their genesis has no relation to Greek.

The most remote script of the group is the Tartessian or Southwest script which could be one or several different scripts. The main bulk of PH inscriptions use, by far, the Northeastern Iberian script, which serves to write Iberian in the levantine coast North of Contestania and in the valle of the river Ebro (Hiber). The Iberic language is also recorded using two other scripts: the Southeastern Iberian script, which is more similar to the Southwest script than to Northeastern Iberian; and a variant of the Ionic Greek Alphabet called the Greco-Iberian alphabet. Finally, the Celtiberian script registers the language of the Celtiberians with a script derived from Northeastern Iberian, an interesting feature is that it was used and developed in times of the Roman conquest, in opposition to the Latin alphabet.

Among the distinctive features of Paleohispanic scripts are:
Semi-syllabism. Half of the signs represent syllables made of occlusive consonants (k,g,b,d,t) and the other half represent simple phonemes such as vowels (a,e,i,o,u) and continuous consonants (l,n,r,ŕ,s,ś).
Duality. Appears on the earliest Iberian and Celtiberian inscriptions and refers to how the signs can serve a double use by being modified with an extra stroke that transforms, for example ge with a stroke  becomes ke . In later stages the scripts were simplified and duality vanishes from inscriptions. 
Redundancy. A feature that appears only in the script of the Southwest, vowels are repeated after each syllabic signs.

Unicode

See also

History of writing
Writing system
Ugaritic alphabet
Paleo-Hebrew Alphabet

References

Jean-Pierre Thiollet, Je m'appelle Byblos, H & D, Paris, 2005. 
 Maria Eugenia Aubet, The Phoenicians and the West Second Edition, Cambridge University Press, London, 2001.
 Daniels, Peter T., et al. eds. The World's Writing Systems Oxford. (1996).
 Jensen, Hans, Sign, Symbol, and Script, G.P. Putman's Sons, New York, 1969.
 Coulmas, Florian, Writing Systems of the World, Blackwell Publishers Ltd, Oxford, 1989.
 Hock, Hans H. and Joseph, Brian D., Language History, Language Change, and Language Relationship, Mouton de Gruyter, New York, 1996.
 Fischer, Steven R., A History of Writing, Reaktion Books, 1999.
 Markoe, Glenn E., Phoenicians. University of California Press.  (2000) (hardback)
 "Alphabet, Hebrew". Encyclopaedia Judaica (CD-ROM Edition Version 1.0). Ed. Cecil Roth. Keter Publishing House.

External links

 Ancient Scripts.com (Phoenician)
 Omniglot.com (Phoenician alphabet)
 official Unicode standards document for Phoenician (PDF file)
  Free-Libre GPL2 Licensed Unicode Phoenician Font
 GNU FreeFont Unicode font family with Phoenician range in its serif face.
  Phönizisch TTF-Font.
 Ancient Hebrew and Aramaic on Coins, reading and transliterating Proto-Hebrew, online edition. (Judaea Coin Archive)
 Paleo-Hebrew Abjad font—also allows writing in Phoenician (the current version of the font is 1.1.0)

 
11th-century BC establishments
Typography
Memory of the World Register
Obsolete writing systems
Alphabet
Canaanite writing systems
Proto-Sinaitic script
Right-to-left writing systems